1960 Egypt Cup Final, was the final match of 1959–60 Egypt Cup, between Zamalek & El-Olympi, Zamalek won the match by 3–2.

Route to the final

Game description

Match details

References

External links 
 http://www.angelfire.com/ak/EgyptianSports/zamalekcup5960games.html#Olympic

1960
EC 1960
EC 1960